James Blanchard (born 1942) is an American politician and former diplomat.

James Blanchard may also refer to:

 James Blanchard (scientist), Canadian physician and professor
 James Blanchard (Canadian politician) (1876–1952), politician in Ontario, Canada
 James U. Blanchard III (1943–1999), American dealer in coins and rare metals
 James W. Blanchard (1903–1987), American submarine commander in the Pacific during World War II